Pan African Airlines is an airline based in Nigeria and owned by the Bristow Group. They mainly provide helicopter and fixed-wing services to the oil industry.

History
Pan African Airlines was founded in Nigeria in 1961.  The Nigerian government set a deadline of April 30, 2007 for all airlines operating in the country to re-capitalise or be grounded, in an effort to ensure better services and safety. The airline satisfied the Nigerian Civil Aviation Authority (NCAA)’s criteria in terms of re-capitalization and was re-registered for operation.

Accidents and incidents
According to the Aviation Safety Database, Pan African Airlines has had one fatal crash, on September 28, 1968, when all 57 people on board a Douglas C-54B airliner were killed when the 24-year old propeller driven airliner struck the tops of two 50-foot high trees while making its approach to Port Harcourt on a nighttime flight from Lagos.  In addition to the passengers, the plane was also carrying a cargo of munitions that exploded upon impact and caused a massive fire that killed the plane's occupants and one person in a village near the airport.

External links
Official website

References

Airlines of Nigeria